Fox Comedy is a television network, launched by the Fox Networks Group, which airs in Poland and Portugal. Its basic programming include numerous comedy series and films.

It was launched in Italy on November 1, 2014, Poland on January 16, 2015, and Portugal on November 18, 2015. The Italian version of Fox Comedy was closed down on October 1, 2019. An Australian version of Fox Comedy launched on September 1, 2020, as a merger of Foxtel's Fox Hits and The Comedy Channel (the latter still owned by News Corp rather than The Walt Disney Company, which owns the European Fox Networks Group).

Programming 
 Raising Hope
 Friends with Benefits
 Boris
 It's Always Sunny in Philadelphia
 Chuck
 Fresh Off the Boat
 Friends with Better Lives
 The Jeffersons
 Mad About You
 The Nanny
 Last Man Standing
 Louie
 Modern Family
 New Girl
 Scrubs
 The Last Man on Earth
 The Grinder
 The Tonight Show
 Wilfred
 Will & Grace
 Friends

Fox Comedy Poland 
 The Office
 Black-ish
 Bob's Burgers
 Family Guy
 Futurama
 Archer
 Brickleberry
 Shin-Chan
 The Simpsons
 How I Met Your Mother
 New Girl
 Speechless
 Last Man Standing
 That '70s Show
 Rules of Engagement
 Will & Grace
 Everybody Loves Raymond
 Modern Family

See also
 Fox Comedy (Portugal)
Fox Comedy (Australian TV channel)

References

External links
 Fox Crime  official Italian website

Fox Networks Group
Defunct television channels in Italy
Television channels in Poland
Television channels and stations established in 2014